The 1984 U.S. Women's Open was the 39th U.S. Women's Open, held July 12–15 at Salem Country Club in Peabody, Massachusetts. Hollis Stacy won her third U.S. Women's Open, one stroke ahead of runner-up Rosie Jones. It was Stacy's fourth and final major title.

The championship was played here thirty years earlier in 1954, won by Babe Zaharias, her tenth and final major title.

Past champions in the field

Made the cut

Source:

Missed the cut

Source:

Final leaderboard
Sunday, July 15, 1984

Source:

References

External links
Golf Observer final leaderboard
U.S. Women's Open Golf Championship

U.S. Women's Open
U.S. Women's Open
U.S. Women's Open
Golf in Massachusetts
U.S. Women's Open
Events in Peabody, Massachusetts
Sports competitions in Massachusetts
Sports in Essex County, Massachusetts
Tourist attractions in Essex County, Massachusetts
U.S. Women's Open
Women's sports in Massachusetts